James Alfred "Buddy" Horne (born October 4, 1933) is a Canadian ice hockey player who competed in the 1956 Winter Olympics.

Horne was a member of the Kitchener-Waterloo Dutchmen who won the bronze medal for Canada in ice hockey at the 1956 Winter Olympics.

References

External links

Buddy Horne's profile at Sports Reference.com

1933 births
Living people
Canadian ice hockey right wingers
Ice hockey players at the 1956 Winter Olympics
Medalists at the 1956 Winter Olympics
Olympic bronze medalists for Canada
Olympic ice hockey players of Canada
Olympic medalists in ice hockey
Ice hockey people from Toronto